Lorenzo Sonego was the defending champion but chose not to participate. Alex de Minaur won the title, having defeated in the final Alexander Bublik with the score 2-0 ret.

Seeds

Draw

Finals

Top half

Bottom half

Qualifying

Seeds

Qualifiers

Qualifying draw

First qualifier

Second qualifier

Third qualifier

Fourth qualifier

Fifth qualifier

Sixth qualifier

References

External links
 Main draw
 Qualifying draw

2021 ATP Tour
2021 Antalya Open – 1
2021 in Turkish tennis